XHPTAC-FM is a radio station on 94.5 FM in Tacámbaro, Michoacán. It carries the Ke Buena national grupera format from Televisa Radio.

History
XHPTAC was awarded in the IFT-4 radio auction of 2017 and came to air at 6:44 pm on February 12, 2018. XHPTAC, together with sister station XHPQGA in Quiroga, are Grupo Vox's first commercially licensed radio stations.

References

External links
Aircheck of XHPTAC's first transmission

Radio stations in Michoacán
Radio stations established in 2018
2018 establishments in Mexico